The 1976 United States Senate election in Arizona took place on November 2, 1976. Incumbent Republican senator Paul Fannin decided to retire instead of seeking a third term. Democrat Dennis DeConcini won the open seat.

Major candidates

Democratic
Dennis DeConcini, Pima County Attorney and businessman
Carolyn Warner, Arizona Superintendent of Public Instruction
Wade Church, former Attorney General of Arizona

Republican
Sam Steiger, U.S. Congressman of Arizona's 3rd congressional district
John Bertrand Conlan, U.S. Congressman of Arizona's 4th congressional district

Results

See also 
 1976 United States Senate elections

References

Arizona
1976
1976 Arizona elections